Krems an der Donau is a town of 23,992 inhabitants in Austria, in the federal state of Lower Austria. Krems is a city with its own statute (or Statutarstadt), and therefore it is both a municipality and a district.

Geography
Krems is located at the confluence of the Krems and Danube Rivers at the eastern end of Wachau valley, in the southern Waldviertel.

Krems borders the following municipalities: Stratzing, Langenlois, Rohrendorf bei Krems, Gedersdorf, Traismauer, Nußdorf ob der Traisen, Paudorf, Furth bei Göttweig, Mautern an der Donau, Dürnstein, and Senftenberg.

History

Krems was first mentioned in 995 in a certificate of Otto III, but settlement was apparent even before then. For example, a child's grave, over 27,000 years old, was found here. This is the oldest grave found in Austria.

During the 11th and 12th centuries, Chremis, as it was then called, was almost as large as Vienna.

At the end of the Thirty Years' War, Swedish troops captured Krems in 1645 during their invasion of Lower Austria. The city was recaptured by Imperial troops under Hans Christoph von Puchheim and Johann Wilhelm von Hunolstein on 5 May 1646.

Krems is the primary producer of Marillenschnaps, an apricot brandy. It is also the hometown of Martin Johann Schmidt, called "Kremserschmidt", the leading painter, draughtsman and etcher of the Austrian late Baroque.

City division 
 Innenstadt (Inner City)
 Weinzierl
 Mitterau
 Stein
 Egelsee
 Rehberg
 Am Steindl
 Gneixendorf
 Lerchenfeld
 Krems-Süd (South Krems)

Population development

The population (with principal residence status) in the agglomeration was about 50,000 at the end of 2010.

Climate

Main sights

Old town 

 Bürgerspitalkirche
 Dominikanerkirche
 Dreifaltigkeitssäule
 Göglhaus
 Gozzoburg
 Großes Sgraffitohaus
 Pfarrkirche St. Veit
 Piaristenkirche
 Pulverturm
 Rathaus
 Simandlbrunnen
 Steiner Tor: The gate, erected in 1480, is the second remaining medieval gate

Outside the Old Town 
 Frauenbergkirche
 Göttweigerhofkapelle
 Großer Passauerhof
 Karikaturmuseum Krems
 Kloster Und
 Kremser Tor
 Kunsthalle Krems
 Forum Frohner
 Landesgalerie Niederösterreich
 Linzer Tor
 Mauthaus
 Minoritenkirche
 Pfarrkirche Hl. Nikolaus
 Salzstadl
 University Krems

Transport 

The city's main railway station is a junction of the Franz-Josefs Railway to Vienna, the Kremser Railway to St. Pölten, the Donauufer Railway to Spitz and the regional railway to Horn. It is at the intersection of the Stockerauer Speedway S5 and the Kremser Speedway S33, and is traversed by the Danube Road B3, the Retzer Road B35, the Kremser Road B37 and the Langenloiser Road B218. Krems is a junction of the Wieselbus bus lines, which provides radial connections between Sankt Pölten and the different regions of Lower Austria.

Main Roads
 Stockerauer Schnellstraße (S5) from Krems to Vienna
 Kremser Schnellstraße (S33) from Krems to St. Pölten
 Donau Straße (B3) from Krems to Linz
 Aggsteiner Straße (B33) from Krems to Melk
 Aggsteiner Straße (B33a) from Krems to Mautern an der Donau
 Retzer Straße (B35) from Krems to Retz
 Kremser Straße (B37) from Krems to Rastenfeld
 Kremser Straße (B37a) from Krems to Traismauer
 Langenloiser Straße (B218) from Krems to Langenlois

Railroad
 Franz-Josefs-Bahn from Krems to Vienna
 Kremser Bahn from Krems to St. Pölten
 Donauuferbahn from Krems to Spitz
 Kamptalbahn from Krems to Sigmundsherberg

Air traffic
 Gneixendorf airfield is a small general aviation airport.

In the city 
A network of four bus lines operates at regular intervals within the city.
Every summer, a tourist train connects the ancient parts of the city with museums, the central railway station and the passenger ship terminal of Krems.

Politics

Municipal council 
The municipal council consists of 40 members and since the municipal elections in 2017 it consists of the following parties:

 19 Social Democratic Party of Austria (SPÖ) – the mayor and the first vice mayor
 8 Austrian People's Party (ÖVP) – the second vice mayor
 5 Freedom Party of Austria (FPÖ)
 2 KLS
 1 Austrian Green Party
 1 PROKS

Municipal elections in Krems were held, at the same time as the Austrian legislative election, 2017 on 15 October 2017.

City's senate 
The city's senate consists of 10 members:
 SPÖ: 5 members
 ÖVP: 4 members
 FPÖ: 1 members

Public facilities

Educational facilities 

 BHAK/BHAS Krems
 Bundesgymnasium Piaristen
 Bundesgymnasium Rechte Kremszeile
 Bundesreal- and Bundesoberstufenrealgymnasium (BORG) Krems Heinemannstraße
 Bundesrealgymnasium Krems Ringstraße
 Danube Private University
 University for Continuing Education Krems
 Adult education centre
 HLA/HLW Krems
 HLF Krems
 HTBL Krems
 IMC Fachhochschule Krems (University of Applied Sciences)
 Karl Landsteiner Privatuniversität für Gesundheitswissenschaften
 Oberstufenrealgymnasium Englische Fräulein
 School of education

Prison 
Justizanstalt Stein is a prison housing some of Austria's worst offenders.

Leisure and sports sites 
Swimming is available at Kremser Strandbad (indoor swimming pool) and outdoor. 
 Football – Kremser SC
 Ice hockey – KEV Eagles
 Miniature golf
 Rugby Club Krems
 Skatepark
 Team handball – Union Handballklub Krems
 Union Badminton Krems

Personalities linked to Krems an der Donau 

 Matthias Abele (1616–1677), town clerk and writer of the 17th century.
 Josef Bayer (1882–1931), director of Natural History Museum in Vienna, one of the discoverers of the Venus of Willendorf
 Josef Maria Eder (1855–1944), photochemist and pioneer of Picture
 Julius Ernest Wilhelm Fučík (1872–1916) composer and conductor; 1891-1894 military musician in Krems (1st Commitment)
 Wilhelm Gause (1853–1916), painter
 Gregor Hradetzky, (1909–1984), canoeist and organ builder
 Wolfgang Kummer (1935–2007), physicist
 Maria Anna Laager (1788–1866), mother of the composer and pianist Franz Liszt
 Ulrike Lunacek (born 1957), journalist and politician
 Margaret of Babenberg (1204–1266), Queen of Bohemia and Duchess of Austria wife of Heinrich (HRR) (VII.)  and Premysl Otakar II, lived in Krems;
 Jakob Oswald of Mayreck (1669–1745), businessman and mayor, in which he has set up house lived Kochel
 Josef Meller (1874–1963), university professor of ophthalmology
 Eduard Melly (born 1814), numismatist

 Wilhelm Miklas (1872–1956), politician (CS) and the third President of the 1st Republic
 Vinzenz Eduard Milde (1777–1853), Dean of Krems and Archbishop of Vienna, pastor of Krems and head of the philosophical educational institution
 Peter B. Neubauer (1913–2008), child psychiatrist and psychoanalyst
 Johann Nordmann (1820–1887), journalist and poet
 Rudolf Redlinghofer (1900–1940), Nazi victims, was beheaded on January 11, 1940 in Berlin-Plötzensee
 Ludwig Ritter von Köchel (1800–1877), musicologist, writer and composer
 Johann Georg Schmidt (Wiener Schmidt) (1685–1748), painter, died in Krems;
 Martin Johann Schmidt (1718–1801), called "Kremser Schmidt", the most outstanding painters of the Austrian Rococo
 Franz Schneider (1812–1897), physician and chemist
 Marko Stankovic, (born 1986), football player
 Robert Streibel, (born 1959), historian
 Michael Wutky (1739–1822), painter
 Cameron Ugbodu (born 2000), visual artist

Twin towns
Krems is twinned with the following cities:
  Ribe, Denmark, since 1971
  Böblingen, Baden-Württemberg, Germany, since 1971
  Beaune, Côte-d'Or, Bourgogne-Franche-Comté, France, since 1973
  Passau, Bavaria, Germany, since 1974
  Kroměříž, Czech Republic, since 1994
  Grapevine, Texas, United States, since 1999

References

External links 

 Pictures of Krems and information in English language
 Video of a street walk through the Old Town of Krems an der Donau
Lower Austria official webpage

 
Populated places on the Danube
Cities and towns in Lower Austria
World Heritage Sites in Austria